Johann Ehrlich (25 September 1894 – 1973) was an Austrian footballer. He played in three matches for the Austria national football team from 1915 to 1917.

References

External links
 
 

1894 births
1973 deaths
Austrian footballers
Austria international footballers
Footballers from Vienna
Association football midfielders
1. Simmeringer SC players